Ambition is a lost 1916 American silent drama film directed by James Vincent and starring Yiddish theatre star Bertha Kalich. It was produced and distributed by the Fox Film Corporation.

Cast
Bertha Kalich as Marian Powers
Kenneth Hunter as Robert Powers
William H. Tooker as John Moore
W. W. Black as James Grant
Kittens Reichert as Betty Powers
Gelbert Rooney  
Barnett Greenwood  
May Price 
Dan Crimmins
Dorothy Phillips

See also
1937 Fox vault fire

References

External links

1916 films
American silent feature films
Lost American films
Fox Film films
American black-and-white films
Silent American drama films
1916 drama films
1916 lost films
Lost drama films
1910s American films
1910s English-language films